This list of Monterrey Institute of Technology and Higher Education faculty includes current and former instructors and administrators of the Monterrey Institute of Technology and Higher Education, a university and high school system located in various parts of Mexico.

 Eugenio Garza Sada Founder of ITESM

Past and present faculty
 Bedrich Benes - Computer Science
 Ismael Aguilar Barajas - Economics
 Horacio Ahuett Garza - Mechanical engineering
 Mario Moises Alvarez - Chemistry
 José Emilio Amores - Chemistry and cultural promoter
 León Ávalos y Vez - first director of the institution
 Tamir Bar-On - Political Science
Alberto Bustani Adem 
 René Cabral Torres - Economics
 Francisco Javier Carrillo Gamboa - Knowledge systems
 María de la Luz Casas Pérez - Communications/Political Science
 María de la Cruz Castro Ricalde - Literature
 Susana Catalina Chacón Domínguez - International relations
 Cristóbal Cobo - communications, new technology
 Delia Elva Cruz Vega - Medicine
 Anabella del Rosario Davila Martínez - Business
 María de Lourdes Dieck-Assad - Economics, Former President of EGADE Business School
 Ernesto Enkerlin - Environmental Studies
 Jurgen Faust - Professor of Design 
 Dora Elvira García González - philosophy
 Silverio García Lara - Biotechnology
 Noemi García Ramírez - Medicine
 María Teresa González-Garza y Barron - Biological sciences
 José Luis González Velarde - Mechanical engineering
 Carlos Guerrero de Lizardi - Economics/Public policy
 Julio César Gutiérrez Vega - Physics
 George Haley - Marketing
 Usha Haley - International Business
 Carmen Hernández Brenes - Biotechnology)
 Bryan William Husten Corregan - Business
 Jorge Ibarra Salazar - Economics
 Vyacheslav Kalashnikov Polishchuk - Mathematics
 Sergei Kanaoun Mironov - Manufacturing systems
 Blanca Guadalupe López Morales - Humanities
 José Carlos Lozano Rendón - Communications
 Ernesto Martens- Chemical engineering
 Carlos Medina Plascencia - Political Science
 María Elena Meneses Rocha - Journalism
 Arturo Molina Gutiérrez - Computer science
 Isidro Morales Moreno - Political science
 Héctor Moreira Rodríguez - administration 
 Daniel Moska Arreola - Finance and administration
 Javier Gonzalez-Sanchez - Computer Science, Former CS Program Director (Guadalajara campus) 
 Maria Elena Chavez-Echeagaray - Computer Science, Former CS Program Director (Guadalajara campus)
 David Muñoz Rodríguez - Electrical engineering
 Rubén Nuñez de Cáceres - Ethics, founder of the Centro de Valores Humanos
 Joaquín Esteban Osaguera Peña - Physics
 Raúl Monroy Borja - Computer science
 Alejandro Poiré Romero - Dean of the School of Social Sciences and Government
 Pol Popovic Karic - Literature
 Oliver Matthias Probst Oleszewski - Physics
 Rajagopal - Management)
 David Noel Ramírez Padilla - Business, former rector of the system
 Rafael Rangel Sostmann - Engineering, former rector of the system
 Javier Francisco Reynoso Javier - Business
 Marco Rito-Palomares - Biochemical Engineering
 Mireille Roccatti - Political science
 Eduardo Rodríguez Oreggi y Roman - Public policy
 Ramón Martín Rodríguez Dagnino - Communications
 Ciro Ángel Rodríguez González - Manufacturing
 Mark B. Rosenberg - Political Science/Latin American Studies
 Julio E. Rubio. Mexico City Regional Dean of the School of Humanities and Education
 Olimpia Salas Martínez - Materials engineering
 Pablo Telman Sánchez Ramírez - International law
 José Fernández Santillán - Political Science
 Roberto Joaquín Santillán Salgado -Business administration
 Arturo Santos García -Medicine
 Macario Schettino - economics, political science
 Sergio Román Othón Serna Saldívar - Biotechnology
 Eduardo Sojo Garza-Aldape - Economics
 María Isabel Studer Noguez - International relations 
 Guillermo Torre Amione - Medicine
 Pedro Ruben Torres Estrada - Law
 Carlos Manuel Urzúa Macías - Economics, Former Secretary of Finance and Public Credit of Mexico.
 Cesar Vargas Rosales - Electrical engineering
 David Velázquez Fernández - Medicine
 Jorge Santos Welti Chanes - Biotechnology
 Adrianni Zanatta Alarcón - Mechatronics Engineering 
 Zidane Zeraoui El Awad - Political Science
 Alex Elias Zuñiga - Mechanical engineering
 Roberto F Delgadillo - Biophysical chemistry: FRET, thermodynamics, fast kinetics, fluorescence, malaria, toxoplasma, drug screening, synthetic peptides, biomedicine.
Carlos Elizondo Mayer-Serra - Economics, Former Ambassador of Mexico for the OECD.

References

Academic staff of the Monterrey Institute of Technology and Higher Education